Outside Bet, also known as Weighed In: The Story of the Mumper, is a British comedy film directed by Sacha Bennett and starring Bob Hoskins, Jenny Agutter, Philip Davis and Adam Deacon. The film was released on 20 April 2012.

Plot
It is 1985. Thatcher is in power, Sade is on the radio, and the print workers have gone on strike. But nothing, not even a scale eight earthquake can put a dampener on a group of close friends that meet every Sunday in their regular South London pub for a pint and free flowing banter of the highest order. Set against the backdrop of a changing way of life-as Rupert Murdoch moves the printing of his newspapers from Fleet Street to Wapping-this is a tale of seven firm friends, who embark on a unique journey that eventually leads them to gamble all of their savings and redundancy money on a single race.

Cast
 Bob Hoskins - Percy 'Smudge' Smith 
 Calum MacNab - Mark 'Bax' Baxter 
 Terry Stone - Johnny Gosamer
 Jenny Agutter - Shirley Baxter 
 Philip Davis - Threads 
 Adam Deacon - Sam The Soleman 
 Vincent Regan - Jago 
 Mark Cooper Harris - Harry
 Emily Atack - Katie 
 Montserrat Lombard - Becka 
 Terry Stone - Johnny Gossamer 
 Perry Benson - Sefton Wallace 
 Dudley Sutton - Alfie Hobnails 
 Linda Robson- Lil
 Rita Tushingham - Martha
 Ali Cook - Stevie
 Lucy Drive - Erica 
 Rebecca Ferdinando - Cheryl

Reception
The film was not well received by critics. The review aggregator website Rotten Tomatoes records 9 reviews with an average rating of 3.4/10.
Other reviews have been more positive - Mark Kermode declared it his Film of the Week, saying he was "charmed" by the film, and also made it one of his 6 "Gems" of the year.

External links

References

British comedy films
Films based on British novels
2012 films
2012 comedy films
Films set in 1985
Gateway Films films
Films set in London
British horse racing films
2010s English-language films
Films directed by Sacha Bennett
2010s British films